Microplaninae is a subfamily of land planarians.

Description
The subfamily Microplaninae was defined by Ogren and Kawakatsu (1988) for land planarians with a short and cylindroid form, anterior end blunt, eyes often small and subepithelial musculature weak. The male copulatory apparatus is often complicated and has a well-developed penis. The female apparatus is very variable, with or without a seminal bursa and with or without a connection with the intestine.

It was originally considered, based on morphological evidence, to be the sister group of the subfamily Rhynchodeminae. However, recent phylogenetic analyses indicated that both subfamilies are not closely related.

Genera
The following genera are recognised in the subfamily Microplaninae:
Amblyplana Graff, 1896
Diporodemus Hyman, 1938
Geobenazzia Minelli, 1974
Incapora Du Bois-Reymond Marcus, 1953
Microplana Vejdowsky, 1890
Othelosoma Grey, 1869
Pseudartiocotylus Ikeda, 1911
Statomicroplana Kawakatsu, Froehlich, Jones, Ogren & Sasaki, 2003

Phylogeny
Phylogenetic tree including the land planarian subfamilies after Álvarez-Presas et al., 2008. Note that Spathula and Romankenkius belong to the Dugesiidae family:

References

Geoplanidae